is a Japanese football player currently playing for Ventforet Kofu.

Playing career
Araki was born in Kanagawa Prefecture on August 25, 1995. After graduating from Kokushikan University, he joined J2 League club Ventforet Kofu in 2018.

Honours

Club
Ventforet Kofu
 Emperor's Cup: 2022

References

External links

1995 births
Living people
Kokushikan University alumni
Association football people from Kanagawa Prefecture
Japanese footballers
J2 League players
Ventforet Kofu players
Association football midfielders